Miss Universe 1999, the 48th Miss Universe pageant, was held on 26 May 1999 at the Chaguaramas Convention Centre in Chaguaramas, Trinidad and Tobago. Mpule Kwelagobe of Botswana was crowned by Wendy Fitzwilliam of Trinidad and Tobago at the end of the event. This edition marks the most recent time that a first-time entry by any country has won Miss Universe and as well the first edition held back-to-back titles by black women. 84 contestants competed in this year.

Results

Placements

Final Competition Score 

 Winner
 First Runner-up
 Second Runner-up
 Top 5 Finalist
 Top 10 Semifinalist
(#) Rank in each round of competition

Contestants
84 contestants competed for the title.

Notes

Returns
 
Last competed in 1966:
  
 
Last competed in 1987:
  
 
Last competed in 1993:
  
  
 
Last competed in 1995:
  
 
Last competed in 1996:
  
  
 
Last competed in 1997:

Withdrawals

During the contest:
  - Miss Guam 1999, Tisha Elaine Heflin had to withdraw a few days before the preliminary competition, after being discovered that she was pregnant.

Others:
 , Miss Bulgaria 1999, Elena Angelova did not compete due lack of sponsorship.
  - Henriette Dankertsen
 - The Miss Romania 1999 pageant was cancelled and their organizers dropped the Miss Universe licence.  
 and  - Did not send delegates due to lack of sponsorship and funding.

Replacements
  - Miss Barbados 1998, Michelle Selman did not compete for undisclosed reasons. Her 1st runner up, Olivia Harding replaced her.
  - The winner of Miss Great Britain Universe 1999, Nicki Lane decided to give up the crown to her 1st runner up Cherie Pisiani, after Lane confessed that she had a child at 14 years old.
  - The winner of Binibining Pilipinas 1999, Janelle Delfin Bautista had to resign due to citizenship issues just like last year's successor, because she is an American citizen.  The Binibining Pilipinas World 1999, Miriam Quiambao assumed the Binibining Pilipinas Universe title.

Designations
  - Daryela Sofía Guerrero Canizales, runner up at Miss Honduras 1998 pageant was appointed by-then national director Eduardo Zablah to represent Honduras at Miss Universe 1999, after the Miss Honduras 1999 pageant was cancelled due to the consequences of Hurricane Mitch from November 1998. Previously she represented La Ceiba at Miss Honduras 1998 and Miss Teen International 1997.
  - Liliana Sofía Pilarte Centeno, 1st runner up at Miss Nicaragua 1998 pageant, was appointed by the Nicaraguan Tourism Institute (INTUR) as the new Miss Nicaragua 1999 at Miss Universe 1999 pageant. After that institution declared that there is neither time nor resources to make another contest. Therefore, Pilarte was the national queen for the next 2 years until 2001.
  - Diana Nogueira, Top 12 at Miss España 1999 pageant was appointed to represent Spain at Miss Universe 1999 by her organization, after the winner of Miss España 1999, Lorena Bernal was ineligible for being underage and therefore went to Miss World 1999. Also the 1st runner up, Carmen Fernández, couldn't go to Miss Universe because her father was seriously sick and went to Miss International 1999, and the 2nd runner up, Inma Nadal had to participate in Miss Europe 1999, and the Miss España organization decided to pick Nogueira as the Spanish representative at Miss Universe 1999. She previously represented Pontevedra at the national contest.

Awards
  - People's Choice Award (Julina Felida)
  - Clairol Herbal Essence Style Award (Miriam Redito Quiambao)
  - Miss Congeniality (Marisa Ferreira)
  - Miss Photogenic (Brenda Liz Lopez)
  - Best National Costume (Nicole Simone Dyer)

Other notes
 Miss Universe title winner, Mpule Kwelagobe, was Botswana's first ever candidate to compete at the Miss Universe pageant.
 The Parade of Nations is similar to 1998's, except that the contestants wore their national costumes this time.

General references

References

External links
 Miss Universe official website

1999
1999 in Trinidad and Tobago
Beauty pageants in South America
1999 beauty pageants